Gabriel Mann (born Gabriel Mick; May 14, 1972) is an American actor and model, known for his role as Nolan Ross on the ABC drama series Revenge. He has co-starred in several films, including The Life of David Gale, The Bourne Identity, and The Bourne Supremacy.  Mann also studied acting at The Neighborhood Playhouse School of the Theatre in New York City.

Life and career
Mann was born in Middlebury, Vermont to Alice Jo (née Amis), an attorney, and Stephen Smith Mick, a sociology professor. Mann began his career as a professional runway model.

He started acting in 1995 in the films Parallel Sons and Stonewall, in which he was credited as Gabriel Mick. He appeared as Father Francis in Dominion: Prequel to the Exorcist, directed by Paul Schrader; when the studio hired Renny Harlin to re-shoot it, Mann's character was recast due to a scheduling conflict. Mann played one of the lead roles in the psychological thriller Psych 9 with Sara Foster, Cary Elwes and Michael Biehn.

Mann appeared in episodes of the television series ER, Fantasy Island, Jeremiah, Carnivàle, Wasteland, Time of Your Life, and Legend of the Seeker. In 2008 he appeared in four episodes of the AMC drama series Mad Men as Arthur Case. He also voiced the role of Bruce Banner in an episode of the animated TV series Wolverine and the X-Men. He reprised the role as a recurring character in the animated TV series The Avengers: Earth's Mightiest Heroes. Wolverine and the X-Men and The Avengers: Earth's Mightest Heroes are set within the same continuity.

In May 2012, Mann joined the ensemble cast of Diego Luna's historical biopic of Cesar Chavez titled Cesar Chavez, which also stars Michael Peña, America Ferrera, Rosario Dawson, John Malkovich, and Wes Bentley. Mann starred as billionaire computer hacker Nolan Ross on the ABC drama series Revenge, which ran from September 21, 2011 – May 10, 2015. He is also signed with DNA Models and previously with Next Models. He has worked with Mario Testino for Gap and as the face of CP Company as well as Richard Avedon for Club Monaco. He has also worked with Mario Sorrenti for Perry Ellis, Ellen Von Unwerth, Steven Klein, Tyler Shields, Marc Jacobs, and Calvin Klein.

In 2019, Mann starred as Gage Scott in the Netflix thriller anthology miniseries, What/If.

Filmography

Film

Television

References

External links
 

1972 births
20th-century American male actors
21st-century American male actors
American male film actors
Male models from Vermont
American male television actors
Living people
Male actors from Vermont
People from Middlebury, Vermont